The 1995 Green Bay Packers season was their 77th season overall and their 75th in the National Football League.  The Packers finished with an 11–5 record in the regular season and won the NFC Central, their first division title since 1982.  In the playoffs, the Packers defeated the Atlanta Falcons at home and the defending champion San Francisco 49ers on the road before losing to the Dallas Cowboys in the NFC Championship Game. Packers' quarterback Brett Favre (who had the best season of his entire career) was named the NFL's Most Valuable Player, the first of three such awards he would win.
This was the first season that the Packers played home games exclusively at Lambeau Field, after playing part of their home slate at Milwaukee County Stadium since 1953. After losing their home opener to St. Louis, the Packers would win an NFL-record 25 consecutive home games between the rest of 1995 and early in 1998.

Offseason

1995 Expansion Draft

NFL Draft

With their third pick (66th overall) in the 1995 NFL draft, the Packers selected future All-Pro fullback William Henderson, a player who would remain with the Packers for over 13 seasons.

Undrafted Free Agents

Staff

Roster

Regular season
The Packers finished with an 11–5 record, clinching the NFC Central crown by a slim 1-game margin over the Detroit Lions.

Schedule

Note: Intra-division opponents are in bold text.

Game summaries

Week 1

Week 2

    
    
    
    
    
    
    
    
    

 Brett Favre 21/37, 312 Yds
 Robert Brooks 8 Rec, 161 Yds

Week 11: vs Chicago Bears

Standings

Postseason

Awards and records
 Brett Favre, NFL MVP
 Brett Favre, Bert Bell Award
 Brett Favre, Offense, UPI NFC Player of the Year
 Brett Favre, NFC Pro Bowl Selection
 Brett Favre, All-Pro Selection
 Brett Favre, National Football League Offensive Player of the Year Award
 Brett Favre, NFC Leader, Average Yards per Completion: 7.7
 Brett Favre, NFC Leader, Passer Rating (99.5) 
 Brett Favre, NFC Leader, Touchdown Passes: 38
 Brett Favre, NFL Leader, Passing Yards, (4,413 yards)
 Reggie White, Defense, UPI NFC Player of the Year
 Reggie White, NFC Pro Bowl Selection

Milestones
 Brett Favre, 1st NFL Season with 4,000 Passing Yards

References

External links
 1995 Green Bay Packers at Pro-Football-Reference.com

Green Bay Packers seasons
Green Bay Packers
NFC Central championship seasons
Green Bay Packers